Newark Township may refer to:

 Newark Township, Webster County, Iowa
 Newark Township, Wilson County, Kansas
 Newark Township, Michigan
 Newark Township, Kearney County, Nebraska
 Newark Township, New Jersey, now the city of Newark
 Newark Township, Licking County, Ohio
 Newark Township, Marshall County, South Dakota, in Marshall County, South Dakota

Township name disambiguation pages